World Art Nouveau Day (WAND) is an event dedicated to Art Nouveau that is celebrated annually on 10 June. The first World Art Nouveau Day in 2013 was organized by The Museum of Applied Arts (Budapest) (IMM) in cooperation with Szecessziós Magazin (a Hungarian Magazine about Art Nouveau). The selected date – 10 June – is the anniversary of the death of two famous architects of the movement, Antoni Gaudí and Ödön Lechner. Activities like those organised on World Art Nouveau Day aim to create more awareness of Art Nouveau heritage among the public.

The two biggest organisations in Europe coordinating the World Art Nouveau Day activities are the Art Nouveau European Route in Barcelona, and the Réseau Art Nouveau Network (RANN) in Brussels. In 2019 the event was supported by European Heritage Alliance.

Each edition is dedicated to a special topic:
2018: My Favourite Art Nouveau Architect
2019: Staircases
2020: Stained-glass
2021: Animals
2022: Typography

Links

References 

Art Nouveau
Art Nouveau
Art Nouveau